Martín Travieso, Jr. (July 6, 1882 – January 15, 1971) was a Puerto Rican politician, senator, lawyer, and judge. He was a member of the Senate of Puerto Rico from 1917 to 1921. He also served as Mayor of San Juan from 1921 to 1923.

Biography

Martín Travieso was born in 1882 in Mayagüez, Puerto Rico. He received his law degree from Cornell Law School in 1903.

In 1904, Travieso joined the Union Party in Puerto Rico, serving as member of the Executive Cabinet from 1908 to 1914. In 1917, he served as provisional governor.

That same year, Travieso was elected to the first Senate of Puerto Rico. He served as senator for one term until 1921. After that, he served as Mayor of San Juan from 1921 to 1923.

Travieso left the Union Party in 1931 and joined the Liberal Party of Puerto Rico. In 1936, he was appointed by President Franklin D. Roosevelt as associate justice of the Supreme Court of Puerto Rico. He then served as Chief Justice of the Supreme Court of Puerto Rico from 1944 to 1948.

For the 1948 general elections, Travieso was a candidate for governor, representing a coalition of several parties (the Socialist Party and Puerto Rican Renewal Party, among others). However, he lost to Luis Muñoz Marín.

Travieso died in 1971 at age 88.

See also
List of Hispanic/Latino American jurists

References

External links
Biografía Martín Travieso on RamaJudicial.PR
Martín Travieso on Library of Congress

|-

|-

|-

1882 births
1971 deaths
20th-century American politicians
20th-century American judges
Chief Justices of the Supreme Court of Puerto Rico
Cornell Law School alumni
Governors of Puerto Rico
Hispanic and Latino American judges
Mayors of San Juan, Puerto Rico
Members of the Senate of Puerto Rico
People from Mayagüez, Puerto Rico
Republican Party (Puerto Rico) politicians
Union of Puerto Rico politicians